Basharyat District is a district (bakhsh) in Abyek County, Qazvin Province, Iran. At the 2006 census, its population was 20,984, in 5,221 families.  The District has one city: Khak-e Ali. The District has two rural districts (dehestan): Basharyat-e Gharbi Rural District and Basharyat-e Sharqi Rural District.

References 

Districts of Qazvin Province
Abyek County